The following tables show results for the Australian House of Representatives at the 1996 federal election held on 2 March 1996.

Australia

States

New South Wales

Victoria

Queensland

Western Australia

South Australia

Tasmania

|abc

Territories

Australian Capital Territory

Northern Territory

See also
 Results of the 1996 Australian federal election (Senate)
 Members of the Australian House of Representatives, 1996–1998

Notes

References

House of Representatives 1996
Australian House of Representatives
1996 elections in Australia